The title of Principal Painter in Ordinary to the King or Queen of England or, later, Great Britain, was awarded to a number of artists, nearly all mainly portraitists.  It was different from the role of Serjeant Painter, and similar to the earlier role of "King's Painter".  Other painters, for example Nicholas Hilliard had similar roles with different titles.  "Principal Painter in Ordinary", first used for Sir Anthony Van Dyck, became settled as the usual title with John Riley in 1689.

The title reflected those used in other courts, especially the French Premier peintre du Roi, which dated to 1603. After the death of Queen Victoria in 1901, the appointment of the last and not very distinguished holder, James Sant, who was in his eighties, was not renewed for the new reign.

The following is a partial list of painters (in chronological order) who held the appointment of Principal Painter in Ordinary to the King, or Queen:

Born 16th or 17th century 
 Sir Anthony Van Dyck (Flemish, 1599–1641), Principalle Paynter in Ordinary to King Charles I and his Queen (1632, at a £200 per annum retainer, plus payment for pictures made)
 Sir Peter Lely (Dutch, 1618–1680), Limner and Picture Drawer to King Charles II (1661, also £200 per annum)
 John Riley (1646–1691), Painter and Picture Drawer, 1681–1689, then Principal Painter in Ordinary, 1689–1691, jointly with Kneller
 Antonio Verrio (Italian, 1636–1707), Chief First Painter, 1684–1688
 Sir Godfrey Kneller (German, 1646–1723), Principal Painter in Ordinary to the King, 1689–1723 (1689–1691 jointly with Riley)
 Charles Jervas (1675–1739), Principal Painter in Ordinary to the King, 1723–1739
 William Kent (1685–1748), Principal Painter in Ordinary to the King, 1740–1748, mainly a designer of interior decorations

Born 18th century 
 John Shackleton (1714–1767), Principal Painter in Ordinary to King George II and then King George III, 1749–1767
 Allan Ramsay (1713–1784), Principal Painter in Ordinary to the King, 1767–1784
 Sir Joshua Reynolds (1723–1792), Principal Painter in Ordinary to the King, 1784–1792
 Sir Thomas Lawrence (1760–1830), Principal Painter in Ordinary to the King, 1792–1830
 Sir David Wilkie (1785–1841), Principal Painter in Ordinary to King William IV and then Queen Victoria, 1830–1841
 Sir George Hayter (1792–1871), Principal Painter in Ordinary to Queen Victoria, 1841–1871

Born 19th century 
 James Sant (1820–1916), Principal Painter in Ordinary to Queen Victoria, 1871–1901

Similar titles 
Van Dyck's appointment, like that of Kneller, was specifically to both the king and queen, but later ones normally only mentioned the monarch. Queen consorts sometimes made their own appointments. In 1796, when Lawrence was Principal Painter in Ordinary to the King, William Beechey was "Portraitist" to Queen Charlotte, and also John Hoppner was "Portrait Painter to the Prince of Wales", having succeeded Sir Joshua Reynolds.  Other occasional positions created included the "Flower Painter in Ordinary" (during the reigns of Queen Adelaide and Queen Victoria), "Miniature Painter in Ordinary", and "Marine Painter in Ordinary" (Queen Victoria). Sir Francis Bourgeois was appointed as royal landscape painter by George III in 1791. Her Majesty's Painter and Limner is part of the Royal Household in Scotland.

Self-portrait gallery

References 

Positions within the British Royal Household
English painters

1632 establishments in England